The following are the national records in athletics in Latvia maintained by its national athletics federation: Latvijas Vieglatlētikas Savienība (LVS).

Outdoor

Key to tables:

+ = en route to a longer distance

ht = hand timing

# = not recognised by federation

Men

Women

U23 Men

Junior Men

Indoor

Men

Women

Notes

See also
List of Baltic records in athletics

References
General
Latvian Outdoor Records - Men 17 October 2021 updated
Latvian Outdoor Records - Women 30 June 2021 updated
Latvian Indoor Records - Men 30 November 2019 updated
Latvian Indoor Records - Women 13 March 2021 updated
Specific

External links
LVS web site
Latvian Athletics Records

National records in athletics (track and field)
Records
Athletics records
Athletics